The 1996 Japan Open Tennis Championships included this tournament in men's doubles.  Mark Knowles and Jonathan Stark were the defending champions but only Knowles competed that year with Rick Leach.

Knowles and Leach lost in the final at 6–2, 6–3 against Todd Woodbridge and Mark Woodforde.

Seeds
The top four seeded teams received byes into the second round.

Draw

Final

Top half

Bottom half

References
 1996 Japan Open Tennis Championships Men's Doubles Draw

Doubles